David Nedohin (born December 20, 1973) is a Canadian curler. Nedohin was born in Winnipeg, Manitoba and now plays out of Sherwood Park, Alberta. He is best known as the longtime fourth for Randy Ferbey.

Curling career
Nedohin joined the Randy Ferbey rink in 1997 and was a part of that team's four Brier championships and three world championships. Nedohin is renowned for his shotmaking ability - especially for making difficult combination takeout shots. Nedohin had a shooting percentage of 96% in the final of the 2003 Nokia Brier, and 95% shooting percentage in the final of the 2005 Men's Ford World Curling Championships. The team, famously named The Ferbey Four, popularized the "fourth" shooting position. Because of Nedohin's shotmaking ability, he threw the last two stones in each end, or the skip rocks. This meant that Ferbey, the skip, threw third stones while the front end positions remained the same. Because Nedohin was not the skip, he was labeled as the "fourth".

In 2010, The Ferbey Four split up with Ferbey joining the Brad Gushue. However, when Ferbey was dropped by the Gushue rink near playdown time, Ferbey and Nedohin re-joined forces again. They made it to the 2011 Boston Pizza Cup.

The 2011/2012 season saw Nedohin and Ferbey try to repeat their previous success by bringing Ted Appelman and Brendan Melnyk to the new team. After a very successful World Curling Tour season in which they qualified for every event they played in except for the Grand Slams, the team failed to qualify for the Northern Alberta Regionals. They lost the Edmonton Zone to Kevin Park. The result saw the team disband as Ferbey retired from competition. Nedohin would announce shortly later that the 2012/2013 season would see him playing with Colin Hodgson, Tom Sallows and Mike Westlund. There were many comparisons made between the newly formed team and early days of 'The Ferbey Four' based on age and experience. Nedohin joined Kevin Martin's team in the 2013–14 curling season after the departure of John Morris, throwing third stones.

He has not officially announced retiring, but has curled very little since the 2014 season, focusing both on family life and curling commentary work.

Personal
Nedohin is the founder and president of Scope AR, a developer of augmented reality solutions and products for field maintenance, manufacturing, and training. He is married to Heather Nedohin and has two daughters. He was also an analyst for CurlTV.com. He attended Oak Park High School in Winnipeg and the University of Manitoba.

Teams

References

External links
 
 Canadian Curling Association profile of David Nedohin
 David Nedohin's Curling Website
 David Nedohin – Curling Canada Stats Archive

1973 births
Living people
Brier champions
Curling broadcasters
Curlers from Edmonton
Sportspeople from Sherwood Park
Curlers from Winnipeg
World curling champions
Canadian male curlers
Continental Cup of Curling participants
Canada Cup (curling) participants